Moivre may refer to:

 Abraham de Moivre
 de Moivre's formula
 28729 Moivre
 Moivre, Marne